This is the List of municipalities in Bolu Province, Turkey .

References 

Geography of Bolu Province
Bolu